Richard Sampson (died 25 September 1554) was an English clergyman and composer of sacred music, who was Anglican bishop of Chichester and subsequently of Coventry and Lichfield.

Biography
He was educated at Trinity Hall, Cambridge, the Paris Sorbonne and Sens (also in France). Having become Doctor of Canon Law, he was appointed by Cardinal Wolsey as diocesan chancellor and vicar-general in his diocese, the bishopric of Tournai, where he lived until 1517. Meanwhile, he gained English preferment, becoming Dean of St. Stephen's, Westminster and of the Chapel Royal (1516), Archdeacon of Cornwall (1517) and prebendary of Newbald (1519). From 1522 to 1525 he was English ambassador to Emperor Charles V. He was now Dean of Windsor (1523), Vicar of Stepney (1526) and held prebends at St. Paul's Cathedral and at Lichfield; he was also Archdeacon of Suffolk (1529).

He became one of Henry VIII Tudor's chief agents in the royal divorce proceedings, which assisted the advancement of his ecclesiastical careerhe was awarded the deanery of Lichfield in 1533, the rectory of Hackney (1534), and treasurership of Salisbury (1535). On 11 June 1536, he was elected Bishop of Chichester, and as such furthered Henry's political andfrom the Catholic point of view schismaticalecclesiastical policy, though not sufficiently thoroughly to satisfy archbishop Thomas Cranmer.

On 19 February 1543, he was translated to the bishopric of Coventry and Lichfield on the royal authority alone, without papal confirmation. He held his bishopric through the reign of Edward VI, though Dodd says he was deprived for recanting his disloyalty to the pope. Godwin the Anglican writer and the Catholic John Pitts both agree that he did so retract, but are silent as to his deprivation. He wrote an "Oratio" in defence of the royal prerogative (1533) and an explanation of the Psalms (1539–48) and of the Pauline Epistle to the Romans (1546).

He died at Eccleshall in Staffordshire.

References

External links

Newadvent.org

15th-century births
1554 deaths
Alumni of Trinity Hall, Cambridge
Bishops of Chichester
Bishops of Lichfield
Burials in Staffordshire
Deans of Windsor
Archdeacons of Cornwall
Archdeacons of Suffolk
16th-century Church of England bishops
Deans of St Paul's
Deans of the Chapel Royal
English classical composers
Renaissance composers
16th-century English musicians
16th-century English composers
Ambassadors of England to the Holy Roman Empire
Deans of Lichfield
16th-century English diplomats
Deans of St Stephen's Chapel, Westminster
English male classical composers
15th-century Anglican theologians
16th-century Anglican theologians